Investment is traditionally defined as the "commitment of resources to achieve later benefits". If an investment involves money, then it can be defined as a "commitment of money to receive more money later". From a broader viewpoint, an investment can be defined as "to tailor the pattern of expenditure and receipt of resources to optimise the desirable patterns of these flows". When expenditure and receipts are defined in terms of money, then the net monetary receipt in a time period is termed as cash flow, while money received in a series of several time periods is termed as cash flow stream. Investment science is the application of scientific tools (usually mathematical) for investments.

In finance, the purpose of investing is to generate a return from the invested asset. The return may consist of a gain (profit) or a loss realized from the sale of a property or an investment, unrealized capital appreciation (or depreciation), or investment income such as dividends, interest, or rental income, or a combination of capital gain and income. The return may also include currency gains or losses due to changes in the foreign currency exchange rates.

Investors generally expect higher returns from riskier investments. When a low-risk investment is made, the return is also generally low. Similarly, high risk comes with a chance of high losses.

Investors, particularly novices, are often advised to diversify their portfolio. Diversification has the statistical effect of reducing overall risk.

Investment and risk 
An investor may bear a risk of loss of some or all of their capital invested. Investment differs from arbitrage, in which profit is generated without investing capital or bearing risk.

Savings bear the (normally remote) risk that the financial provider may default.

Foreign currency savings also bear foreign exchange risk: if the currency of a savings account differs from the account holder's home currency, then there is the risk that the exchange rate between the two currencies will move unfavourably so that the value of the savings account decreases, measured in the account holder's home currency.

Even investing in tangible assets like property has its risk. And similar to most risks, property buyers can seek to mitigate any potential risk by taking out mortgage and by borrowing at a lower loan to security ratio.

In contrast with savings, investments tend to carry more risk, in the form of both a wider variety of risk factors and a greater level of uncertainty.

Industry to industry volatility is more or less of a risk depending. In biotechnology, for example, investors look for big profits on companies that have small market capitalizations but can be worth hundreds of millions quite quickly. The risk is high because approximately 90% of biotechnology products researched do not make it to market due to regulations and the complex demands within pharmacology as the average prescription drug takes 10 years and US$2.5 billion worth of capital.

History 

The Code of Hammurabi (developed during his reign between 1792-1750 BC) provided a legal framework for investment, establishing a means for the pledge of collateral by codifying debtor and creditor rights in regard to pledged land. Punishments for breaking financial obligations were not as severe as those for crimes involving injury or death.

In the medieval Islamic world, the qirad was a major financial instrument. This was an arrangement between one or more investors and an agent where the investors entrusted capital to an agent who then traded with it in hopes of making a profit.  Both parties then received a previously settled portion of the profit, though the agent was not liable for any losses. Many will notice that the qirad is similar to the institution of the commenda later used in western Europe, though whether the qirad transformed into the commenda or the two institutions evolved independently cannot be stated with certainty.

In the early 1900s, purchasers of stocks, bonds, and other securities were described in media, academia, and commerce as speculators. Since the Wall Street crash of 1929, and particularly by the 1950s, the term investment had come to denote the more conservative end of the securities spectrum, while speculation was applied by financial brokers and their advertising agencies to higher risk securities much in vogue at that time. Since the last half of the 20th century, the terms speculation and speculator have specifically referred to higher risk ventures.

Investment strategies

Value investing 

A value investor buys assets that they believe to be undervalued (and sells overvalued ones). To identify undervalued securities, a value investor uses analysis of the financial reports of the issuer to evaluate the security. Value investors employ accounting ratios, such as earnings per share and sales growth, to identify securities trading at prices below their worth.

Warren Buffett and Benjamin Graham are notable examples of value investors. Graham and Dodd's seminal work, Security Analysis, was written in the wake of the Wall Street Crash of 1929.

The price to earnings ratio (P/E), or earnings multiple, is a particularly significant and recognized fundamental ratio, with a function of dividing the share price of the stock, by its earnings per share. This will provide the value representing the sum investors are prepared to expend for each dollar of company earnings. This ratio is an important aspect, due to its capacity as measurement for the comparison of valuations of various companies. A stock with a lower P/E ratio will cost less per share than one with a higher P/E, taking into account the same level of financial performance; therefore, it essentially means a low P/E is the preferred option.

An instance in which the price to earnings ratio has a lesser significance is when companies in different industries are compared. For example, although it is reasonable for a telecommunications stock to show a P/E in the low teens, in the case of hi-tech stock, a P/E in the 40s range is not unusual. When making comparisons, the P/E ratio can give you a refined view of a particular stock valuation.

For investors paying for each dollar of a company's earnings, the P/E ratio is a significant indicator, but the price-to-book ratio (P/B) is also a reliable indication of how much investors are willing to spend on each dollar of company assets. In the process of the P/B ratio, the share price of a stock is divided by its net assets; any intangibles, such as goodwill, are not taken into account. It is a crucial factor of the price-to-book ratio, due to it indicating the actual payment for tangible assets and not the more difficult valuation of intangibles. Accordingly, the P/B could be considered a comparatively conservative metric.

Growth investing 
Growth investors seek investments they believe are likely to have higher earnings or greater value in the future. To identify such stocks, growth investors often evaluate measures of current stock value as well as predictions of future financial performance. Growth investors seek profits through capital appreciation – the gains earned when a stock is sold at a higher price than what it was purchased for. The price-to-earnings (P/E) multiple is also used for this type of investment; growth stock are likely to have a P/E higher than others in its industry. According to Investopedia author Troy Segal and U.S. Department of State Fulbright fintech research awardee Julius Mansa, growth investing is best suited for investors who prefer relatively shorter investment horizons, higher risks, and aren’t seeking immediate cash flow through dividends.

Some investors attribute the introduction of the growth investing strategy to investment banker Thomas Rowe Price Jr., who tested and popularized the method in 1950 by introducing his mutual fund, the T. Rowe Price Growth Stock Fund. Price asserted that investors could reap high returns by “investing in companies that are well-managed in fertile fields.”

Momentum investing 
Momentum investors generally seek to buy stocks that are currently experiencing a short-term uptrend, and they usually sell them once this momentum starts to decrease. Stocks or securities purchased for momentum investing are often characterized by demonstrating consistently high returns for the past three to twelve months. However, in a bear market, momentum investing also involves short-selling securities of stocks that are experiencing a downward trend, because it is believed that these stocks will continue to decrease in value. Essentially, momentum investing generally relies on the principle that a consistently up-trending stock will continue to grow, while a consistently down-trending stock will continue to fall.

Economists and financial analysts have not reached a consensus on the effectiveness of using the momentum investing strategy. Rather than evaluating a company’s operational performance, momentum investors instead utilize trend lines, moving averages, and the Average Directional Index (ADX) to determine the existence and strength of trends.

Dollar cost averaging 

Dollar cost averaging (DCA), also known in the UK as pound-cost averaging, is the process of consistently investing a certain amount of money across regular increments of time, and the method can be used in conjunction with value investing, growth investing, momentum investing, or other strategies. For example, an investor who practices dollar-cost averaging could choose to invest $200 a month for the next 3 years, regardless of the share price of their preferred stock(s), mutual funds, or exchange-traded funds.

Many investors believe that dollar-cost averaging helps minimize short-term volatility by spreading risk out across time intervals and avoiding market timing. Research also shows that DCA can help reduce the total average cost per share in an investment because the method enables the purchase of more shares when their price is lower, and less shares when the price is higher. However, dollar-cost averaging is also generally characterized by more brokerage fees, which could decrease an investor’s overall returns.

The term “dollar-cost averaging” is believed to have first been coined in 1949 by economist and author Benjamin Graham in his book, The Intelligent Investor. Graham asserted that investors that use DCA are “likely to end up with a satisfactory overall price for all [their] holdings.”

Intermediaries and collective investments
Investments are often made indirectly through intermediary financial institutions. These intermediaries include pension funds, banks, and insurance companies. They may pool money received from a number of individual end investors into funds such as investment trusts, unit trusts, and SICAVs to make large-scale investments. Each individual investor holds an indirect or direct claim on the assets purchased, subject to charges levied by the intermediary, which may be large and varied.

Approaches to investment sometimes referred to in marketing of collective investments include dollar cost averaging and market timing.

Famous investors
Investors famous for their success include Warren Buffett, who ranked second in the Forbes 400 list of the March 2013 edition of Forbes magazine. Buffett has advised in numerous articles and interviews that a good investment strategy is long-term and due diligence is the key to investing in the right assets.

Edward O. Thorp was a highly successful hedge fund manager in the 1970s and 1980s who spoke of a similar approach.

The investment principles of both of these investors have points in common with the Kelly criterion for money management. Numerous interactive calculators which use the Kelly criterion can be found online.

Investment valuation
Free cash flow measures the cash a company generates which is available to its debt and equity investors, after allowing for reinvestment in working capital and capital expenditure. High and rising free cash flow, therefore, tend to make a company more attractive to investors.

The debt-to-equity ratio is an indicator of capital structure. A high proportion of debt, reflected in a high debt-to-equity ratio, tends to make a company's earnings, free cash flow, and ultimately the returns to its investors, riskier or volatile. Investors compare a company's debt-to-equity ratio with those of other companies in the same industry, and examine trends in debt-to-equity ratios and free cashflow.

See also

Capital accumulation
Capital gains tax
Climate-related asset stranding
Diversification (finance)
Divestment
EBITDA
Foreign direct investment
Fundamental analysis
Fundamental Analysis Software
Legal Alpha
List of countries by gross fixed investment as percentage of GDP
List of economics topics
Market sentiment
Mortgage investment corporation
Rate of return
Socially responsible investing
Specialized investment fund
Time value of money
Time-weighted return

References

External links